Bobby Kokavec (born 17 May 1976) is a former professional tennis player from Canada.

Biography
Kokavec grew up in Tecumseh, Ontario and attended St. Anne's Catholic High School. At the age of 15 he was an Orange Bowl semi-finalist and won national junior titles in singles and doubles. A member of Canada's Sunshine Cup team in 1993, he also competed in the boys' events of Grand Slam tournaments and was a doubles quarter-finalist at the 1993 US Open, partnering Sjeng Schalken. He and Jocelyn Robichaud won the Under 18s doubles title at the 1994 Orange Bowl.

As a professional tennis player he made several appearances in ATP Tour level tournaments, including the main draws of every edition of the Canadian Open from 1994 to 1999. Doubles partners included Pat Cash in the 1996 tournament and Gustavo Kuerten in the 1997 edition. He made the second round of the singles in 1998, with a win over Steve Campbell. His best doubles performances on tour were the quarter-finals at the 1998 Legg Mason Tennis Classic, with partner Marco Osorio, as well as the quarter-finals of Boston's Pro Tennis Championships in 1999, teamed with Doug Flach.

Kokavec represented Canada in a tie against Mexico in the 1998 Davis Cup competition. The tie, an American Group 1 Quarter-final in Halifax, was won by Canada, with Kokavec's appearance coming in the first of the reverse singles, a loss to Alejandro Hernández.

With Romania's Gabriel Trifu as his partner, Kokavec participated in the men's doubles draw at the 1999 Wimbledon Championships. Playing as qualifiers, the pair defeated Alberto Martín and Eyal Ran in the first round, then were eliminated by top seeds and eventual champions Mahesh Bhupathi and Leander Paes.

In 2001 he had success on the Challenger tour with three titles, all in doubles, at Granby, Binghamton and the Bronx. It was his last year on tour as injuries forced his retirement from tennis. An inductee in the Windsor/Essex County Sports Hall of Fame, Kokavec now teaches tennis in Florida.

ATP Challenger and ITF Futures finals

Singles: 2 (1–1)

Doubles: 11 (7–4)

See also
List of Canada Davis Cup team representatives

References

External links
 
 
 

1976 births
Living people
Canadian male tennis players
People from Essex County, Ontario
Sportspeople from Ontario
Racket sportspeople from Ontario